Samardo Samuels (born January 9, 1989) is a Jamaican professional basketball player for Bashkimi Prizren of the Kosovo Basketball Superleague.

High school career
Samuels attended Saint Benedict's Preparatory School in Newark, New Jersey. Samuels was ranked 9th in the nation by Rivals.com and 2nd in the nation by Scout.com. He, alongside class of 2010 star Tristan Thompson led St. Benedicts's Prep to a 24–1 record in the 2007–2008 season. At season's end St. Benedict's was ranked #2 in the nation by USA Today. He played in the two top all-American games, the McDonald's All-American Game and the Jordan Brand Classic.

College career
Samuels decided to attend the University of Louisville for college. He chose the Cardinals over Connecticut, Florida, Georgetown and North Carolina. At Louisville, Samuels started every game that he played in and led the 2009–10 team in scoring and rebounding. After his sophomore year, he decided to skip his final two years of college eligibility and enter the 2010 NBA draft.

Professional career

Cleveland Cavaliers (2010–13)
After going undrafted in the 2010 NBA draft, Samuels played for the Chicago Bulls in the 2010 NBA Summer League, averaging 12.6 points and 7.4 rebounds. On August 17, 2010, Samuels signed a 3-year, $2.3 million contract with the Cleveland Cavaliers. A portion of the deal was guaranteed.

He debuted against the Toronto Raptors, on October 29, and scored 7 points. On December 27, 2010 he was sent to the Erie BayHawks, the Cavs' affiliate in the NBA Development League. On January 1, after two games in the NBA D-League, he was recalled by the Cavs.

On March 2, 2011, Samuels made his first career start against the San Antonio Spurs in place of the injured Antawn Jamison and scored a career high 23 points while pulling down 10 rebounds.

On December 28, 2012, Samuels was assigned to the Canton Charge of the D-League. He was recalled on December 31, 2012. On January 6, 2013, he was waived by the Cavaliers.

Several short stints (2013)
Following the waiving by the Cavaliers, he was acquired by the D-League's Reno Bighorns on January 17, 2013.

On April 7, 2013, Samuels signed with the Israeli club Hapoel Jerusalem for the rest of the 2012–13 season.

Olimpia Milano (2013–15)
On July 25, 2013, he signed a two-year deal with the Italian club Emporio Armani Milano. In his first Euroleague season with Milano, he averaged 9.5 points and 3.9 rebounds over 25 games. In his second season with Milano, he elevated his game and averaged 12.9 points and 5.4 rebounds over 23 Euroleague games. In the summer of 2015, he parted ways with Olimpia Milano.

Barcelona (2015–16)
On July 22, 2015, Samuels signed a two-year deal with the Spanish club FC Barcelona Lassa. On September 11, 2015, Barcelona announced that Samuels has suffered right hand injury and will miss about 6 weeks of action. In his third consecutive Euroleague season, his role in the new team decreased, and he had averages of 6 points and 2.8 rebounds over 26 games. On August 16, 2016, he parted ways with Barcelona.

Jiangsu Dragons (2016–17)
On August 17, 2016, Samuels signed with the Chinese Basketball Association club Jiangsu Dragons for the 2016–17 CBA season.

Several short stints (2017–present)
On March 17, 2017, he signed with the Italian club Enel Brindisi for the rest of the 2016–17 LBA season.

On August 18, 2017, Samuels signed with the Spanish club Real Betis Energía Plus. On September 21, 2017, he parted ways with Real Betis Energía Plus before appearing in a game for them.

On October 16, 2017, Samuels signed with the Serbian club Partizan for the rest of the 2017–18 season. He was suspended by the club on November 15, for the violation of club's discipline and the provisions of the contract, day after Partizan lost in a EuroCup game against Alba Berlin. The suspension came as a result of his public criticism of the club, head coach Miroslav Nikolić and other inappropriate remarks toward female journalists. Shortly after, he parted ways with the club.

On February 14, 2018, Samuels signed with the French club Limoges CSP for the rest of the 2017–18 season. After averaging 11 points and 4 rebounds per game, he re-signed with the club on August 20, 2018.

On February 16, 2020, Samuels signed with Chorale Roanne Basket.

In December 2020, Samuels signed with Maccabi Hod HaSharon. He played 17 games in the Liga Leumit, the second national tier, and averaged 16.2 points and 7.8 rebounds. On April 18, 2021, he has signed with Hapoel Haifa of the  Israel Basketball Premier League.

On August 10, 2021, Samuels signed a one-year contract with Dutch club ZZ Leiden of the BNXT League. On August 30, 2021, he parted away with his club without playing a single game. Reason was that the work permit procedure took too long.  Samuels subsequently joined Libertadores de Querétaro of the Liga Nacional de Baloncesto Profesional.

Career statistics

NBA

Regular season

|-
| align="left" | 
| align="left" | Cleveland
| 37 || 10 || 18.9 || .456 || .000 || .618 || 4.3 || .5 || .4 || .5 || 7.8
|-
| align="left" | 
| align="left" | Cleveland
| 54 || 0 || 15.3 || .455 || .000 || .701 || 3.3 || .4 || .4 || .4 || 5.4
|-
| align="left" | 
| align="left" | Cleveland
| 18 || 1 || 10.9 || .367 || .000 || .583 || 1.6 || .4 || .2 || .2 || 3.2
|- class="sortbottom"
| align="left" | Career
| align="left" | 
| 109 || 11 || 15.8 || .445 || .000 || .653 || 3.4 || .4 || .3 || .4 || 5.9

Career highs
Points: 23 vs. San Antonio 03/02/11
Rebounds: 10 3 times
Assists: 3 vs. San Antonio 03/02/11
Steals: 3 @ L.A. Clippers 03/19/11
Blocks: 3 vs. New Orleans 03/06/11

EuroLeague

|-
| style="text-align:left;"| 2013–14
| style="text-align:left;"| Milano
| 25 || 23 || 22.2 || .503 || .444 || .730 || 3.9 || .2 || .4 || .3 || 9.5 || 8.5
|-
| style="text-align:left;"| 2014–15
| style="text-align:left;"| Milano
| 23 || 21 || 26.1 || .548 || .233 || .692 || 5.4 || .7 || .4 || .5 || 12.9 || 14.3
|-
| style="text-align:left;"| 2015–16
| style="text-align:left;"| Barcelona
| 26 || 4 || 13.2 || .505 || .000 || .632 || 2.8 || .5 || .2 || .4 || 6.0 || 6.8
|- class="sortbottom"
| align="center" colspan="2"| Career
| 74 || 48 || 24.1 || .522 || .250 || .685 || 4.0 || .5 || .3 || .4 || 9.3 || 9.7

Career highs
Points: 36 vs. Nizhny Novgorod 26 February 2015
Rebounds: 12 vs. Anadolu Efes 21 March 2014
Assists: 3 vs. Turów Zgorzelec 13 November 2014
Steals: 4 vs. Laboral Kutxa 13 March 2014
Blocks: 4 vs. Stelmet Zielona Góra 23 October 2015

References

External links
 
 Samardo Samuels at draftexpress.com
 Samardo Samuels at eurobasket.com
 Samardo Samuels at euroleague.net
 Samardo Samuels at fiba.com
 

1989 births
Living people
ABA League players
Big3 players
Canton Charge players
Centers (basketball)
Chorale Roanne Basket players
Cleveland Cavaliers players
Erie BayHawks (2008–2017) players
FC Barcelona Bàsquet players
Hapoel Jerusalem B.C. players
Jamaican expatriate basketball people in Serbia
Jamaican expatriate basketball people in Spain
Jamaican expatriate basketball people in the United States
Jamaican expatriate basketball people in France
Jamaican men's basketball players
Jiangsu Dragons players
KK Partizan players
Lega Basket Serie A players
Liga ACB players
Limoges CSP players
Louisville Cardinals men's basketball players
McDonald's High School All-Americans
New Basket Brindisi players
Olimpia Milano players
 Maccabi Hod HaSharon players
Hapoel Haifa B.C. players
Parade High School All-Americans (boys' basketball)
People from Trelawny Parish
Power forwards (basketball)
Reno Bighorns players
St. Benedict's Preparatory School alumni
Undrafted National Basketball Association players
American men's 3x3 basketball players
Jamaican expatriate basketball people in China
Jamaican expatriate basketball people in Israel
Jamaican expatriate basketball people in Italy
Jamaican expatriate basketball people in Greece
Jamaican expatriate basketball people in Mexico
Jamaican expatriate basketball people in Kosovo